Chabbal Waadi (also known as Mountain of Death) is located in Nigeria and, at , is the country's highest point. It is located in Taraba State, near the border with Cameroon, on the edge of Gashaka Gumti Forest Reserve and Gashaka-Gumti National Park on the Mambilla Plateau. It is a part of the Bamenda-Alantika-Mandara Mountain chain of Nigeria and Cameroon.

Gallery

References

Mountains of Nigeria
Taraba State
Highest points of countries